Florarctus is a genus of tardigrades, in the subfamily Florarctinae which is part of the family Halechiniscidae. The genus was named and described by Claude Delamare Deboutteville and Jeanne Renaud-Mornant in 1965.

Species
The genus includes 14  species:
 Florarctus acer Renaud-Mornant, 1989
 Florarctus antillensis Van der Land, 1968
 Florarctus asper Renaud-Mornant, 1989
 Florarctus cervinus Renaud-Mornant, 1987
 Florarctus cinctus Renaud-Mornant, 1976
 Florarctus glareolus Noda, 1987
 Florarctus heimi Delamare Deboutteville & Renaud-Mornant, 1965
 Florarctus hulingsi Renaud-Mornant, 1976
 Florarctus kwoni Chang & Rho, 1997
 Florarctus pulcher Grimaldi de Zio, Lamarca, D’Addabbo Gallo & Pietanza, 1999
 Florarctus salvati Delamare Deboutteville & Renaud-Mornant, 1965
 Florarctus stellatus Renaud-Mornant, 1989
 Florarctus vulcanius Renaud-Mornant, 1987
 Florarctus wunai Fujimoto, 2015

References

Publications
Delamare Deboutteville & Renaud-Mornant (1965), Un remarquable genre de Tardigrades des sables coralliens de Nouvelle-Calédonie. [A remarkable genre of tardigrates from coral sands in New Caledonia] Comptes rendus hebdomadaires des séances de l'Académie des sciences, vol. 260, p. 2581-2583

Halechiniscidae
Tardigrade genera